Anthony Joseph Novak (born March 27, 1994) is a Canadian professional soccer player who plays as a forward for Valour FC of the Canadian Premier League.

Early life
Novak was born in Pickering, Ontario and began playing youth soccer with Pickering SC. He played as a goalkeeper in his youth with Wexford SC, Glen Shields SC, as well as the Durham regional program. He later joined the youth system of the Toronto Lynx.

College career
In 2012, he committed to attend Lake Erie College, where he would play four seasons of NCAA Division II soccer. He scored his first collegiate goal on September 2, 2012 against  In 2013, he was earned All-Ohio Division II honours. In 2014, he was named to the All-GLIAC First Team, All-Ohio First-Team, and All-Midwest Region Third Team honours. On October 25, 2015, he scored a hat-tick against the Walsh Cavaliers. In 2015, he earned All-Midwest Second-Team, All-GLIAC Second-Team, and All-Ohio Second-Team honours. During his time with Lake Erie, he made two appearances as a goalkeeper, starting a match against the Tiffin Dragons on October 23, 2013 and taking over late in a match against the Seton Hill Griffins, following a red card to the starting goalkeeper on September 5, 2015.

Club career
From 2012 to 2014, he played with the Toronto Lynx in the Premier Development League.

In 2015, he began playing with Oakville Blue Devils FC in League1 Ontario, who re-branded from the Lynx, upon the Lynx's folding. On April 29, 2018, he scored a hat trick in the season opener in a 5-0 victory over Toronto Skillz FC. In 2015, he was named a league Mid-Season All-Star. In 2017 and 2018, he played in the league all star games against the PLSQ. On August 12, 2018, he scored another hat-trick in a 5-0 victory over Ottawa South United. In 2018, he won the league's Golden Boot as the top goal-scorer with 18 goals during the season and was also named a league First Team All-Star. With the Blue Devils, he won the L1O championship in both 2015 and 2017.

In April 2019, he joined Forge FC in the Canadian Premier League, after participating in a two-week trial with the club during their pre-season. On May 8, he made his debut for the club against Pacific FC, also scoring his first goal for the club, scoring just three minutes into the match. On August 13, 2020, he scored an overhead kick goal against Cavalry FC. On October 22, 2020, he scored the winning goal in a 2-1 victory over Municipal Limeño of El Salvador in a CONCACAF League match and added an assist in a victory against Panamanian club Tauro FC. With Forge, he won the league championship in both 2019 and 2020. Over his two seasons with Forge, he scored nine goals and added five assists in 32 matches across all competitions.

In February 2021, he signed his first contract abroad, joining Campeonato de Portugal side Clube Condeixa. He joined on a contract until the end of the 2020/2021 season. He recorded his first assist in a 1-0 win over Vitória de Sernache.

In April 2021, he returned to the Canadian Premier League, signing a multi-year contract with Cavalry FC. He made the 3400km trip to Calgary from Ontario entirely by car, upon his signing. He scored two goals against his former club Forge that season. In March 2022, he tore his lateral collateral ligament, which required surgery, causing him to miss the entire 2022 season.

In March 2023, he signed with Valour FC in the Canadian Premier League.

Career statistics

Honours

Club
Forge FC
Canadian Premier League: 2019, 2020

References

External links

1994 births
Living people
Association football forwards
Canadian soccer players
Soccer people from Ontario
People from Pickering, Ontario
Canadian expatriate soccer players
Expatriate soccer players in the United States
Canadian expatriate sportspeople in the United States
Expatriate footballers in Portugal
Canadian expatriate sportspeople in Portugal
Toronto Lynx players
Lake Erie Storm men's soccer players
Blue Devils FC players
Forge FC players
Cavalry FC players
Valour FC players
USL League Two players
League1 Ontario players
Canadian Premier League players
Campeonato de Portugal (league) players